Malaysia national cerebral palsy football team is the national cerebral football team for Malaysia that represents the team in international competitions.  The team competed at the 2015 ASEAN Para Games.

Background 
NPC Malaysia is in charge of the national team. While Malaysia was active in participating in international regional competitions by 2016, the country did not have a national championships to support national team player development.

In 2013, the rules for the sport set by the CPISRA allowed for both men and women to be on the team. By January 2015, the rules had changed and only men were eligible to be a member of the national team.

Players 
There have been a number of players for the Malaysian squad.

Rankings 
The team is unranked in the world. The team is also unranked regionally in Asia-Oceania. In November 2014, the team was ranked number 24 in the world. In August 2013, the team was ranked number   23 in the world. In September 2012, the team was ranked number 21 in the world. In July 2011, the team was ranked number 21 in the world.

Results 
The country has never participated in a Paralympic Games since the sport made its debut at the 1984 Games.

Malaysia has participated in a number of international tournaments.  The team played in the 2015 ASEAN Para Games.  In their 2 - 1 loss to Singapore, Mohamad Sobri scored his team's only goal that brought the score to a 1 - 1 draw. In the forty-third minute, Singapore's Muhammad Mubarak Md Rastam scored the team's go ahead goal and Malaysia was unable to answer back.  5,323 people attended the bronze medal match in Singapore.

References 

Football in Malaysia
National cerebral palsy football teams
C